Martin Damm and Pavel Vízner are the defending champions, but did not play together that year.
Martin Damm partnered with Robert Lindstedt, but lost in the first round to Arnaud Clément and Michaël Llodra.
Pavel Vízner partnered with Simon Aspelin, but lost in the first round to Julien Benneteau and Fabrice Santoro.

Seeds

Draw

Draw

External links
Main Draw

Doubles